Lake Wylie is a reservoir or man-made lake in the U.S. states of South Carolina and North Carolina. The lake has a surface area of 13,400 acres (54.2 km2) (20.9 mi2) (5420 ha) and features  of shoreline.

History
The man-made lake was first formed when the Catawba Power Company built the Catawba Dam and Power Plant near India Hook, South Carolina in 1904. This dam impounded the Catawba River and created Lake Catawba, which was utilized to create hydro-electric power. In 1905, the Catawba Power Company became part of the Southern Power Company.

In 1924, the Southern Power Company raised the level of the dam and built the new Catawba Hydroelectric Station to replace the original. This facility opened in August 1925, increasing the surface area of Lake Catawba from 668 acres (2.70 km2) to 13,400 acres (54.2 km2). The Southern Power Company was merged with Duke Power Company in 1927.

In October 1960, the power station was renamed the Wylie Hydroelectric Station, and the lake was renamed Lake Wylie in honor of W. Gil Wylie, one of the founders of the original Catawba Power Company that had created the lake and become Duke Power.

Other information
Lake Wylie's location on both the South Carolina and North Carolina borders makes it a common recreational destination for residents of nearby cities including Charlotte, Fort Mill, and Rock Hill. Duke Power manages six public boat access areas on the lake. There are also two towns that are located on Lake Wylie, including Tega Cay and Lake Wylie.

Lake Wylie is one of 11 lakes on the Catawba River and is the oldest lake in the Catawba River basin, with water being moved around each lake on the chain system through Duke Power. The average depth of the lake is just over 20 feet.

The Catawba Nuclear Generating Station is located on the south-western part of the lake, and draws its cooling water from the lake. Allen Steam Station located on the northern part of the lake (west of Charlotte) also draws its cooling water from the lake.

The South Fork River and Catawba River confluence is now submerged under Lake Wylie near the North Carolina/South Carolina state line.

See also
 Lake Wylie, South Carolina
 Catawba Nuclear Generating Station
 Buster Boyd Bridge
 List of lakes in South Carolina

References

External links
 Boat Rentals on Lake Wylie Lake Wylie Boat Rentals

Protected areas of Gaston County, North Carolina
Protected areas of Mecklenburg County, North Carolina
Reservoirs in North Carolina
Reservoirs in South Carolina
Protected areas of York County, South Carolina
Duke Energy dams
Bodies of water of Gaston County, North Carolina
Bodies of water of Mecklenburg County, North Carolina
Bodies of water of York County, South Carolina
1904 establishments in North Carolina
1904 establishments in South Carolina
Catawba River